Opogona amphichorda is a moth of the family Tineidae. It was described by Edward Meyrick in 1921 and is found in Congo and in Mozambique. Its forewings are pale ochreous-yellowish with a dark fuscous pointed streak along basal fourth of the costa.

Related pages
List of moths of Mozambique
List of moths of the Democratic Republic of Congo

References

Opogona
Moths described in 1921